Peter Olver may refer to:

Peter Olver (RAF officer) (1917–2013), British World War II Royal Air Force pilot
Peter J. Olver (born 1952), professor of mathematics at the University of Minnesota